Ken Sprague (1 January 1927 – 25 July 2004) was an English socialist political cartoonist, journalist and activist, involved in trade union, civil rights and peace movements. In later life he was also a TV presenter and a psychotherapist.

Sprague was concerned with how politics affected the ordinary person. "In essence, the leitmotif of his work is about power and the abuse of power as well as the resilience of ordinary working people to this abuse... It is an art of engagement – engagement for change." Martin Rowson said "Ken's art has the power and strength to inspire. He is the true heir, as a socialist artist, of William Morris."

Early years
Sprague was born in Bournemouth, to a father who was a train driver and a mother who worked in a cardboard box factory. His first work of art, in 1937, in response to the Guernica air raid in the Spanish Civil War, was a linocut made from linoleum torn from the kitchen floor. Printed on his mother's mangle, it was used on collecting sheets for Spain.

He was educated at Alma Road Elementary School – until it was bombed during World War II – and Porchester Road Secondary Modern School. There the headmaster, noticing his talent, recommended that he apply to the local art college. He won a scholarship to Bournemouth Municipal College and, from 13 and a half, studied graphics – since in those days students of his background were rarely considered for fine arts courses.

One morning in 1944 he volunteered for the Royal Marines, aged 17,  — and that same afternoon, in Southampton, he joined the Communist Party. After basic military training he was transferred to Vickers-Supermarine as a technical artist, working on ejector seats for Spitfires. He was also sent to Yugoslavia to bring back an ejector seat from a German plane the partisans had shot down, during which visit he adopted the big handlebar moustache that was to become his trademark for the rest of his life.

Postwar, and after a summer stint in a circus, he completed his college diploma course in design and illustration. The Communist Party, he told his biographer, was his university, but after the Bournemouth Daily Echo had labelled him a college revolutionary, local job prospects dwindled. He briefly worked for a volunteer labour battalion in Yugoslavia, and was employed by the Boy Scouts.

Activist journalist/artist
Between 1950 and 1954 Sprague worked in a Carlisle mining company design office – doubling as a cartoonist for the local Conservative and Liberal newspapers. Then came a move to London as the Daily Worker'''s publicity manager, which also had him working as a journalist and cartoonist. Devastated by the Soviet invasion of Hungary in 1956, in 1959 Sprague left to set up, with Ray Barnard, the publicity company, Mountain & Molehill (M&M). Yet he continued producing cartoons for the Worker, and its successor the Morning Star, into the 21st century.

M&M – later The Working Arts – was responsible for some of the most innovative trade union campaigns of the 1960s and 1970s. Sprague told union leaders they had to use publicity to win hearts and minds and to see it as an integral part of union work. And it was Sprague and Barnard who initiated the sensational 1961 visit to Britain of the first man in space, Soviet cosmonaut Yuri Gagarin, inviting the former foundry worker to speak to the Amalgamated Union of Foundry Workers (now part of Amicus). M&M also worked for the Indian High Commission, which led to a meeting with Jawaharlal Nehru.

During the 1950s and '60s, Sprague also did several set designs for the left-wing Unity Theatre, including productions of George Bernard Shaw's The Apple Cart, Anton Chekhov's The Cherry Orchard and Arthur Miller's The Crucible.

In the late 1960s Ken began editing the Transport and General Workers' Union's The Record, transforming it into a lively newspaper, and illustrating it with his own cartoons. In 1976 he edited the anti-fascist magazine Searchlight for some months, before being sacked when he published a criticism of Israeli oppression of Palestinians.

As a poster and print-maker he worked with a number of leading progressive organisations and individuals, including Pete Seeger. He drew political cartoons for the Daily Worker and its successor the Morning Star, and for Tribune and Peace News. He created posters for among others Martin Luther King Jr. and the Greenham Common Women's Peace Camp. He created posters against Edward Heath's Industrial Relations Act 1971 and the 1984 miners' strike, but among his most powerful works are those relating to war, including the Soviet invasion of Czechoslovakia, the Iran–Iraq War, and the Kosovo war. He was a war artist during the Iran–Iraq War, accompanying an Iraqi regiment during an attack on the oil town of Abadan when it lost 582 men in a single day. He met Saddam Hussein and sketched him. He encountered some criticism form comrades, given Hussein's brutal dictatorship (including CIA-supported slaughter of communists), but Sprague maintained he was documenting the horrors of war, the subject which had first brought him to political art. He won several prestigious awards, including poster of the year award from the Council of Industrial Design on two occasions.

His linocuts for the radical collective Cinema Action's Kill The Bill film (1971), relating to the Industrial Relations Bill, began an involvement in moving images, which led to Jeff Perks's 1976 BBC Omnibus documentary The Posterman. This led to a series of Channel 4 films, devised with Jeff Perks and presented by Ken, called Everyone A Special Kind of Artist (1986). There was also a 1979 BBC South West series The Moving Line, with Joan Bakewell.

Later life
In 1971 he moved with his wife, Sheila, a talented potter, to Holwell, a farmhouse in Devon, and converted it into an artistic centre. Sheila died of cancer in 1973, but with his second wife, Marcia, he set up the Holwell International Centre for Psychodrama and Sociodrama which continued until 1998. There Ken combined his artistic talents with pedagogic expertise, using them in this new field in which he became a leading practitioner. The project hit difficulties shortly after an unexpected demand for a large VAT payment by HM Revenue and Customs. Ken and Marcia moved to a smaller house, Hoewell, in Lynton, where they continued the work begun in Holwell.

Sprague left the Communist Party after its acrimonious split in 1988. He continued to call himself a communist, however, saying "The party left me, I didn’t leave the party".

Books
 John Green (2002), Ken Sprague: People's Artist, Hawthorn Press in partnership with Artery Publications

John Green is also the author of other books on socialist activists, like the Jewish East End anti-fascist Aubrey Morris, the trade union leader Ken Gill and a biography of Marx's collaborator Friedrich Engels

References

External links
 Ken Sprague Fund, commemorating his life and work, runs the Ken Sprague International Political Cartoon Competition
 New Internationalist, March 2005, "Ken Sprague: David Ransom pays tribute to an unheralded genius"
 Carl Dutton, Nerve magazine, 8 April 2006, "Ken Sprague - People's Artist" 
 John Green, The Guardian, 6 August 2004, "Ken Sprague: Radical artist in the service of socialism" 
 Karl Dallas, The Independent'', 2 August 2004, "Ken Sprague: Political artist who sought to build 'a picture road to socialism'"
 Political Cartoons by Ken Sprague

1927 births
2004 deaths
British editorial cartoonists
English cartoonists
English male journalists
Artists from Bournemouth
Psychodramatists
English political journalists
20th-century Royal Marines personnel